Pretties is a 2005 science fiction novel and the second book of the Uglies Trilogy written by Scott Westerfeld. The premise of the novel relies on a future set in a future dystopian world in which everyone is turned "Pretty" by extreme cosmetic surgery upon reaching age 16. It tells the story of teenager Tally Youngblood who rebels against society's enforced conformity in hopes of exposing the societies dangerous obsessions with perfection and uniformity.

Plot
The book begins with Tally, the main protagonist, as a Pretty debating what to wear to a bash. While attending the bash, at which she is to be voted into the "Crims" clique, she is followed by someone who appears to be a "Special", a member of Special Circumstances. She soon finds him and discovers that it is Croy, a Smokey she knew before she turned pretty. He tells her that he left a note for Tally in Valentino Mansion. Real Specials arrive, so he leaves and Tally tries to follow him by jumping off a balcony with Peris, who is wearing a bungee jacket. They bounce, though Tally is hit in the head hard enough to make her bleed, and is voted into the Crims because of her "bubbly" stunt.

Tally returns to her carefree life as a Pretty. Her peace is disrupted when Zane, the leader of the Crims, asks her about David, whom she loved while she lived in the Smoke. Zane and Tally kiss and fall in love.

Zane had once known Croy and had been determined to escape to the Smoke before his surgery. He regrets that he didn't go into the wilderness then. Zane is eager to accompany Tally to find the object Croy has hidden for her. They face strenuous, dangerous physical challenges in order to locate the item, which is accompanied by a letter from Tally to herself, written before she was turned pretty. The letter explains to her future self why she became a Pretty – to test two pills that will cure her from the foggy-headed life of a Pretty. Tally was afraid to take the pills alone, so she and Zane split them right before Special Circumstances arrive. They are fitted with cuffs similar to interface rings, but they can't come off.

After taking the pills, Zane starts getting bad headaches, but he seems to be more cured than Tally. One day the Crims pull a bubbly trick by using alcohol to melt a hovering ice rink and crash a soccer game, causing the clique to become famous. Later that night at the bonfire, Shay and Tally get into a huge fight, causing Shay to turn on Tally. Afterwards, Dr. Cable offers Tally a job as a Special, which she immediately turns down.

One day, Tally and Zane are found by Sussy and Dex, two uglies who helped Tally and David back when she was a Smokey. While in Uglyville, they find out that Shay has started a clique with Crim rejects called Cutters, where they cut themselves to cure the lesions. Zane has a headache attack, and Tally takes him to the hospital under the guise of an injured hand.

Zane and Tally soon get to decide to escape the city with a few other Crims. Fausto helps Zane and Tally get the cuff off, and they soon escape the city by hoverboarding out of a hot-air balloon. Peris, Tally's friend from her Ugly days, decides in the balloon that he does not want to go to the New Smoke, but he agrees to stall for Tally. Tally's hoverboard crashes, and she falls into a reservation with rather primitive people who seem to be very violent. She is considered a god there because of her beauty. There she meets Andrew Simpson Smith, the village holy man, who is the only one who speaks her language, which they call the language of the gods, with significant fluency. Andrew tries to help her reach the Rusty Ruins, though he says that they are beyond the end of the world. Through their travels, Tally comes to deduce that the villagers are living in a forcefield-protected reservation where Specials and Pretty Scientists conduct experiments about violence and ways to reduce mankind's violent nature. During this time, Tally starts to wonder if Dr. Cable's words to her have some truth - perhaps the Pretty operation that clouds everyone's minds is the only way that humans can live in peace, without destroying each other or the planet.

Tally steals a hovercar from the visiting scientists to escape to the Rusty Ruins. When she calls, she sees someone coming down on a hover board and is shocked to find that it is David who has come to take her to the New Smoke. When she arrives, Maddy tells her that the pills she and Zane took separately were meant to be taken together. Zane's pill contained the nanos that were supposed to eat away the lesions, but they ate more of Zane's brain tissue than the lesions because they needed the pill that Tally took to stop them. Tally, in fact, cured herself, since the pill that she took only stopped nanos; it did not contain nanos itself to heal the lesions.

They soon discover that, when Zane went to the hospital, a tracker chip was put in his tooth. Tally decides to stay with Zane instead of escaping with David. David believes that she only wants to stay with Zane because he is a Pretty. To make David leave and not get caught himself, Tally tells him to "get his ugly face out of here". It has the desired result and he flees. She stays with Zane which leads to her getting caught by the Specials along with Fausto. She discovers Shay has been turned into a Special. The book ends with Shay saying 'face it Tally-wa, you're special'.

See also

The Uglies series
Scott Westerfeld
Dystopian fiction

External links
 Scott Westerfeld Website
 Official Uglies series downloadables site
 Author page at Pulse Blogfest

2005 science fiction novels
2005 American novels
Fiction set in the 24th century
American science fiction novels
American young adult novels
Children's science fiction novels
Dystopian novels
Novels by Scott Westerfeld